The Basilica of San Albino, formerly known as San Albino Church of Mesilla, is part of the Roman Catholic Diocese of Las Cruces and is located in Mesilla, New Mexico. It has the distinction of having originally been established in Mexico, but it is now located in the United States as a result of a transfer of territory in the Gadsden Purchase. The first church on the site was built in 1852; the current structure was built in 1906, and is one of the oldest churches in the region. Daily Masses are held in both Spanish and English.

Appearance
The basilica sits on the north side of the town square, and is built of fired brick, with a belfry facade on each corner. There are leaded stained glass windows depicting saints, and geometric designs line the walls of the nave. The parapet between the belfries is much like a mission style. Both the interior and the exterior walls were stripped of their plaster during a renovation and stabilization in the 1960s. A memorial to parishioners who died in combat is near the front entry.  The church is surrounded by a low stone wall.

History
After the conclusion of the Mexican–American War in 1846, the town of Mesilla was established sometime around 1850 on the Mexican side of the newly established Mexican–American border, by refugees from former Mexican territory that had been ceded to the United States. A priest, Ramón Ortiz y Miera, was appointed to be Commissioner of Emigration to assist in resettling these Mexican citizens. The Mexican government ordered the church established in 1852 to support local residents. The settlers soon constructed a church on the south side of Mesilla's central plaza. This first building was constructed of mud and logs, and dedicated to the Breton Saint Albinus of Angers (Albino in Spanish), who was born in Vannes, France in 469.

Following the Gadsden Purchase in 1854, Mesilla and portions of present-day southern Arizona and New Mexico became United States territory.  At this point, the church was transferred to the diocese that is now the Roman Catholic Archdiocese of Santa Fe. The shepherd of this four-year-old diocese at this time was a Frenchman, Bishop Jean Baptiste Lamy. Lamy was instrumental in the growth of a number of churches in his diocese. As part of this growth, a new San Albino church was constructed on the north side of the plaza with French architecture.

In 1872, the parish became part of the Vicariate Apostolic of Arizona, under another Frenchman, Rev. Jean-Baptiste Salpointe. It was during this time, in 1876, that the first bell for the church was commissioned. In 1908 the current church was constructed on the same site. The church later became part of two dioceses after they were established: the Roman Catholic Diocese of El Paso in 1916, and the Roman Catholic Diocese of Las Cruces in 1982.

In 2008, the Congregation for Divine Worship and the Discipline of the Sacraments in the Vatican granted minor basilica status to San Albino.

References

External links
  

Mexican-American culture in New Mexico
Roman Catholic churches completed in 1906
Churches in Doña Ana County, New Mexico
Albino, Basilica of San
Albino, Basilica of San
1852 establishments in New Mexico Territory
20th-century Roman Catholic church buildings in the United States